Wilhelm Gros (6 July 1892 – 13 September 1917) was a German international footballer.

References

1892 births
1917 deaths
Association football midfielders
German footballers
Germany international footballers